Stadio Renzo Barbera (commonly known as La Favorita) is a football stadium in Palermo, Italy.  It is currently the home stadium of Palermo F.C. team. The stadium was inaugurated during the fascist era on 24 January 1932, and was originally named Stadio Littorio after the Italian word for the fasces symbol. The opening match was Palermo vs Atalanta, with Palermo winning 5–1.  A running track surrounded the pitch and there were no stands behind either goal. In 1936, the stadium was renamed Stadio Michele Marrone, in memory of a soldier killed during the Spanish Civil War. In 1945, the name was changed again at the end of World War II to Stadio La Favorita, taken from the name of the local ancient game preserve of Frederick II, Holy Roman Emperor in the 13th century.

In 1948, the running track was removed and stands behind each goal were built. The stadium then remained largely unchanged until 1984, when the second main redevelopment took place involving the addition of a second tier to the stadium, which increased total capacity to 50,000 spectators. This maximum capacity was, however, only reached twice: in a Serie C1 league match against Sicilian rivals Messina, and for a friendly match against Juventus. A third, and to date the most recent, modernisation of the stadium took place in 1990, due to city of Palermo having been chosen to host a number of the 1990 FIFA World Cup First Round matches. A tragic accident occurred during the course of these works, resulting in the deaths of five construction workers. Following this redevelopment, the total capacity of the stadium was lowered to its current 37,619 seats.

On 18 September 2002 the stadium was officially renamed as Stadio Comunale Renzo Barbera, in honour of the chairman of Palermo during the club's last Serie A tenure, as well as the two Coppa Italia finals throughout the 1960s and the 1970s, who had died that same year on 19 May. In the Serie A 2004-05 campaign, which marked Palermo's first appearance in the top division for over 30 years, all seats in the stadium were already sold before the season began to season-ticket holders. However, this was not repeated in the next years.

Transports
The stadium is linked to the city center and the central railway station by regular bus route 101.

1990 FIFA World Cup
The stadium was one of the venues of the 1990 FIFA World Cup, and staged the following matches:

Concerts
The stadium was frequently used as a music concert venue during the 1980s. Starting in the 1990s, however, concerts and other cultural events were gradually banned from the stadium due to fears they could damage the grass on the field. The Renzo Barbera Stadium is currently the only stadium in Italy where concerts are prohibited. 
From the early 1990s, large open air concerts in Palermo were held at the Velodromo Paolo Borsellino instead. 
 
Below is a list of artists who have performed at the Renzo Barbera Stadium in the past.

References

Renzo Barbera
Renzo
1990 FIFA World Cup stadiums
Palermo F.C.
Sports venues in Palermo